The Mogai class (モガイ) was a class of steam tank locomotives of the Chosen Government Railway (Sentetsu) with 2-6-0 wheel arrangement. The "Moga" name came from the American naming system for steam locomotives, under which locomotives with 2-6-0 wheel arrangement were called "Mogul". The Moga class was the first type of steam locomotive in Korea, introduced by the Gyeongin Railway in 1899 for use on the Incheon—Noryangjin line.

Description
The Mogai-class locomotives were tank locomotives with one leading axle and three powered axles, carrying water and coal without a tender. The axle load is estimated to have been around 5 tons per axle. It was quickly found insufficient, and no further locomotives of the same wheel arrangement were introduced.

Four 2-6-0T tank locomotives were built for the Seoul & Chemulpo Railway - the English name of the Gyeongin Railway - by the Brooks Locomotive Works in the United States, and were shipped to Korea disassembled and assembled at Incheon on 17 June 1899. Numbered 1–4, they were originally built with buffers-and-chain couplers, but these were replaced with Janney couplers around 1904–1905. The Gyeongin Railway was acquired by the Gyeongbu Railway in 1903, which renumbered them 101–104; they were later transferred to Sentetsu after the nationalisation of the Gyeongbu Railway in 1906, and were used as general purpose locomotives until eventually being replaced by the Sentetsu Pure class locomotives. In 1918 they were designated モガ (Moga) class by Sentetsu, retaining their Gyeongbu Railway numbers as モガ101 – モガ194, and Sentetsu's 1938 reclassification became モガイ (Mogai) class モガイ1 through モガイ4.

Although said to have been retired in the 1930s, they were nevertheless accounted for in the 1947 division of Sentetsu assets between North and South Korea, with three going to the Korean National Railroad in the South and one to the Korean State Railway in the North.

Gallery

References

Locomotives of Korea
Locomotives of North Korea
Locomotives of South Korea
Railway locomotives introduced in 1899
2-6-0T locomotives
Brooks locomotives